(May 23, 1684 – March 24, 1743) was a Japanese daimyō of the Edo period, who ruled the Tokushima Domain. His court title was Awa no kami.

Family
 Father: Hachisuka Takayoshi (1643-1698)
 Concubine: unknown
 Children:
 Daughter
 daughter married Higashizono Motoaki

Ancestry

References

1684 births
1743 deaths
Daimyo
Hachisuka clan